Tom Palin is a British painter.

Education
Palin grew up in Birkenhead, Merseyside, England. He graduated from Liverpool John Moores University with a BA (Hons) in Fine Art, and from the University of Manchester with an MA in Art History. He completed a PhD in Painting at the Royal College of Art.

Painting

Tom Palin's work consists almost entirely of small scale oil paintings. These explore the boundaries between abstraction and figuration and combine an interest in the iconography of the everyday and of the romantic with a concern for the material surface of paint and the passing of time. His work appears as muted, painterly and, in narrative terms, ambiguous. He cites Maurice Utrillo as a major influence. His work can be found in The University of Liverpool's Art Collection.  Tom Palin is included in The Dictionary of Artists in Britain since 1945 (David Buckman, 2006).

He has exhibited his work in a number of solo and collaborative exhibitions, including solo shows at: Leeds Arts University, (Leeds 2018), The Central Gallery (Ashton-under-Lyne, 2010), View 2 Gallery (Liverpool, 2008), Dean Clough (Halifax, 2005) and at The Atkinson Art Gallery and Library, (Southport, 2004).

Palin teaches painting at the Royal College of Art and the Open College of the Arts. He has written about medium specificity, abstract art and the work of Maurice Utrillo.

Awards

Tom Palin has been the recipient of the following awards:

British Institution Award. Royal Academy Summer Exhibition, Burlington House, London, 2015.
Second Prize. Motorcade/FlashParade Open (Bristol, 2011).
Major Award. The Wirral Open (Williamson Art Gallery and Museum, 2011).
The Alumni Award (Liverpool JMU and The University of Liverpool, 2005).
Gilchrist-Fisher Memorial Award for Landscape Painters (Rebecca Hossack Gallery, 2004).
Emerson Group Award (Manchester Academy of Fine Arts, 2002).
Hunting Art Prize Young Artist of the Year Award (Royal College of Art, 2000).
Student Award (St Helens Open, 1997).

Residencies

He held The Feiweles Trust Bursary Award in 2002 which saw the completion of 100 art workshops in the West Yorkshire region and culminated in the exhibition Pride of Place: A Painter's Perspective, at the Yorkshire Sculpture Park.

References

External links
Tom Palin's web page
Workshops

1974 births
Alumni of Liverpool John Moores University
Living people
21st-century British painters
British male painters
People educated at Birkenhead Park School
21st-century British male artists